The Genesee Arch Bridge (also known as the Portage Viaduct or Portage Bridge) is a steel arch railroad bridge over the Genesee River in Letchworth State Park, Livingston County, New York. It is the third bridge at this location: the original timber bridge burned in 1875 and was replaced by an iron bridge, which lasted until it was replaced by the current bridge in 2017. It carries the Southern Tier Line of Norfolk Southern Railway.

Previous bridges

The Erie Railroad Company built a wooden trestle bridge over the Genesee River just above the Upper Falls in the mid-1800s. Construction started on July 1, 1851, and the bridge opened on August 14, 1852. At the time, it was the longest and tallest wooden bridge in the world. In the early morning hours of May 6, 1875, the bridge was destroyed in a tremendous fire. The bridge was a total loss, leaving only the stone bridge abutments.

Immediately after the fire, officials of the Erie Railroad Company moved quickly to replace the wooden bridge with one built of iron. Construction began on June 8, 1875, and the bridge opened for traffic on July 31, 1875. This bridge was used until December 10, 2017. Despite a weight restriction, the 400-ton Nickel Plate 765 steam locomotive passed over the bridge with passenger coaches as part of a heritage excursion in August 2015.

Popular local rumor contends that the Portage Bridge was used for a famous scene in the 1986 movie Stand By Me. In reality, the bridge used in the movie is the Lake Britton Bridge in McArthur-Burney Falls Memorial State Park near Redding, California.

Current bridge

Norfolk Southern offered the 1875 bridge to the State of New York as a tourist viewing platform of the Upper Falls, but the State declined it, citing a lack of available funding.

A steel arch design for the new bridge, estimated to cost $71 million, was approved in late 2014. Construction started on October 27, 2015. Following the normal seasonal closing of the Portageville park auto entrance road for the winter in 2015, it remained closed until completion of the project in 2018. By late 2016, surveying work for the foundation of the new bridge was underway. In March 2017, construction of the main arch began.

On December 11, 2017, the first train crossed the new bridge. The last pieces of the 1875 bridge were demolished on the morning of March 20, 2018. Norfolk Southern formally named the new bridge the "Genesee Arch Bridge" on May 24, 2018.

References

Further reading

External links 

NKP 765 Erie Limited over the Portage Viaduct at Letchworth State Park – Video of a heritage passenger excursion over the bridge

Railroad bridges in New York (state)
Genesee River
Bridges completed in 1852
Viaducts in the United States
Steel bridges in the United States
Iron bridges in the United States
Trestle bridges in the United States
Buildings and structures in Livingston County, New York
Erie Railroad bridges
Norfolk Southern Railway bridges
Bridges completed in 2017
Transportation in Livingston County, New York